Big Spring is a census-designated places in Montgomery County, in the U.S. state of Missouri.

Demographics

History
A post office called Big Spring was established in 1830, and remained in operation until 1906. The community was named for a big spring near the original town site.

References

Census-designated places in Montgomery County, Missouri